Legal status is the status or position held by an entity as determined by the law. It includes or entails a set of privileges, obligations, powers or restrictions that a person or thing has as encompassed in or declared by legislation.

Jack Balkin has defined the term by writing that "In law, status is generally a characteristic of an individual that has some legal consequences. Examples are being a servant, a woman, or a minor. Sometimes legal status refers to a characteristic wholly created by law, such as being a Social Security recipient." Thus, legal status is "a feature of individuals and their relationships to the law". Tiffany Graham added to Balkin's definition: "legal status refers to a set of characteristics that define an individual's membership in an official class, as a consequence of which rights, duties, capacities and/or incapacities are acquired."

Footnotes

International law
Conflict of laws